The 2013–14 Siena Saints men's basketball team represented Siena College during the 2013–14 NCAA Division I men's basketball season. The Saints, led by first year head coach Jimmy Patsos, played their home games at the Times Union Center, with some exhibition and postseason games at Alumni Recreation Center, and were members of the Metro Atlantic Athletic Conference. They finished the season 20–18, 11–9 in MAAC play to finish in fifth place. They lost in the quarterfinals of the MAAC tournament to Canisius. They were invited to the College Basketball Invitational where they defeated Stony Brook, Penn State and Illinois State to advance to the best-of-3 finals vs Fresno State. In the finals, they defeated Fresno State 2 games to 1 to be crowned 2014 CBI champions.

Roster

Schedule

|-
!colspan=11 style="background:#008000; color:#ffd700;"| Exhibition

|-
!colspan=11 style="background:#008000; color:#ffd700;"| Regular season

|-
!colspan=11 style="background:#008000; color:#ffd700;"| MAAC tournament

|-
!colspan=11 style="background:#008000; color:#ffd700;"| CBI

References

Siena Saints men's basketball seasons
Siena
Siena
College Basketball Invitational championship seasons
Siena Saints men's basketball
Siena Saints men's basketball